Shake 'n Bake is a flavored bread crumb-style coating for chicken and pork manufactured by Kraft Foods.

Shake 'n Bake, Shake & Bake or Shake and Bake may also refer to:

Film and television
 Jimmy Dolan Shake and Bake, a key plot point in the 1994 film The Air Up There
 Shake and bake, a memorable phrase used in the 2006 movie Talladega Nights: The Ballad of Ricky Bobby
 "The Adventures of Shake and Bake", an SCTV skit parodying the Baconian theory of Shakespearean authorship

Military
 A non-commissioned officer (NCO) of the United States Army who was promoted quickly through an NCO school with little actual time in the military
 Military slang for the combined use of high explosives and white phosphorus in Fallujah

Music
 "Shake & Bake", a song by the Shrinking Dickies from the 1979 album The Incredible Shrinking Dickies
 "Shake & Bake", a song by Digital Underground from the 1993 album The Body-Hat Syndrome
 "Shake & Bake", a 2019 song by Left Lane Cruiser 
 "Shake & Bake", a song by Amy Jack from the 2020 album Introducing Amy Jack
 "Shake 'N Bake", a song by Stevie Ray Vaughan from the 1985 album ''Archives

People
 Archie Clark (basketball) (born 1941), American basketball player
 Glenn Doughty (born 1951), American football player
 Bake McBride (born 1949), American baseball player
 Vaughn Bean (born 1974), American professional boxer

Pharmaceuticals
 An illicit method of making methamphetamine
 A nickname for the highly toxic fungicidal drug amphotericin B

Sports
 In basketball; a behind the back crossover dribble
 In pickleball; a strategy used by the serving team

Other uses
 A wildland firefighter's emergency fire shelter
 A type of snow coach